The FIFA Development Committee is one of the nine standing committees of FIFA. Its purpose is to deal with FIFA’s development programs.

Membership

References

FIFA Committees